Holon, also known as Hōlon, is an outdoor stone sculpture by Donald Wilson, located in the South Park Blocks in Portland, Oregon, United States. It was originally commissioned in 1978–1979 and re-carved in 2003–2004. It is part of the City of Portland and Multnomah County Public Art Collection courtesy of the Regional Arts & Culture Council, which administers the work.

Description and history

Donald Wilson's Holon was originally commissioned in 1978–1979 and dedicated to the late Dr. Gordon Hearn, the first dean of Portland State University's School of Social Work. Its name comes from the Greek holos, which means "whole, entire, complete in all its parts – something that has integrity and identity at the same time as it is a part of a larger system". The sculpture was carved from white Indiana Limestone. It measured approximately  x  x  and rested on a brick base that measured around  x  x . When the Smithsonian Institution surveyed the sculpture for its "Save Outdoor Sculpture!" program in April 1993, the organization categorized the piece as abstract, its condition as "treatment needed", and noted that Wilson had removed graffiti previously.

The sculpture was re-carved from granite in 2003–2004 and installed in Portland's South Park Blocks, between Southwest Harrison and Southwest Hall streets in front of the Branford Price Millar Library, in 2004. The Regional Arts & Culture Council, which administers the work, describes it as reflective of the university's "holistic" design. The sculpture measures  x  x . Its base includes a plaque that reads, "" The work is part of the City of Portland and Multnomah County Public Art Collection courtesy of the Regional Arts & Culture Council.

See also
 1979 in art
 2004 in art
 Holism
 Holon (philosophy)
 Interlocking Forms (1977), another Portland sculpture by Wilson

References

External links

 A Guide to Portland Public Art (PDF), Regional Arts & Culture Council
 A walk through the PSU Park Blocks: Past and Present (pg. 4; PDF), The Raps Sheet (February 2011), Portland State University
 Holon at the Public Art Archive
 Portland's First Parks: The South Park Blocks: A Walking Tour (PDF), City of Portland

1979 establishments in Oregon
1979 sculptures
2004 establishments in Oregon
2004 sculptures
Abstract sculptures in Oregon
Granite sculptures in Oregon
Holism
Limestone sculptures in Oregon
Monuments and memorials in Portland, Oregon
Outdoor sculptures in Portland, Oregon
Portland State University campus
South Park Blocks